Environmental issues in Serbia include air pollution, deforestation, various categories of threat to endemic species and climate changes. Several environmental organizations operating in Serbia have protested the government's handling of these issues.

1999 NATO bombing of Yugoslavia

The NATO bombings of 1999 caused lasting damage to the environment of Serbia, with several thousand tons of toxic chemicals stored in targeted factories being released into the soil, atmosphere and water basins affecting humans and the local wildlife.

In 2001, doctors at the Serb-run hospital in Kosovska Mitrovica say the number of patients with malignant diseases has increased by 200% since 1998. In the same year, the World Health Organization reported that data from Kosovo was inconclusive and called for further studies.

A 2003 study by the United Nations Environment Programme (UNEP) in Bosnia and Herzegovina stated that low levels of contaminate were found in drinking water and air particulate at DU penetrator impact points. The levels were stated as not a cause for alarm. Yet, Pekka Haavisto, chairman of the UNEP DU projects stated, "The findings of this study stress again the importance of appropriate clean-up and civil protection measures in a post-conflict situation."

Pollution

Air pollution 
According to a WHO report, Serbia has higher estimates of premature death due to air pollution than most countries in the European Union. Assessments of air quality based on data from monitoring stations managed by national authorities indicate that the concentrations of air pollutants, especially particular matter, regularly exceed the levels that protect human health. The report states that the main sources of outdoor air pollution in Serbia include the energy sector, the transport sector, waste dump sites and industrial activities, such as the petrochemical industry complex in Pančevo and Novi Sad; cement factories in Popovac, Kosjerić and Beočin; chemical plants and metallurgical complexes in Smederevo, Sevojno and Bor; thermal power plants in Obrenovac, Lazarevac and Kostolac. Other documented sources of air pollution include fossil fuel-based individual household heating in periurban and rural towns and increasing road traffic, especially in large cities such as Belgrade, Novi Sad and Niš.

In January 2020, hundreds of people, some wearing surgical masks and respirators, attended a protest in Belgrade, demanding the government tackle severe air pollution. In March, the Air Visual API website ranked Belgrade temporarily at the top of its global index of cities with the worst air pollution.

Water contamination 
Findings of a WHO-supported survey in Serbia have shown that one third of rural water systems inspected in Serbia did not meet standards for microbiological drinking-water quality, which has led the Serbian government to revise some of its regulation. Contamination of water in Serbia is also sometimes caused by frequent floods. Human contact with this polluted water can cause various health problems, such as infections, skin inflammation or conjunctiva. Many cities, towns and villages have higher levels of arsenic in water than allowed by law and recommended by the WHO. The autonomous province of Vojvodina has the biggest problem with arsenic polluted water, with readings from Novi Bečej reaching up to 27 times the legal limit.

Small Hydropower Plants 
Around 100 small hydropower plants have been built in Serbia, according to the Ministry of Environmental Protection. The state power company offers strong incentives and commits to buying electricity generated by the plants at a price 50 percent higher than the market rate.

In 2018, thousands of citizens of Pirot protested against the construction of small hydropower plants in protected areas. Activists of the environmental initiative Defend the Rivers of Stara Planina (Odbranimo reke Stare planine) have requested for the construction to stop in all protected areas and performed multiple actions to prevent further construction. The village of Rakita has become an important front in their battle. In May 2019, the president of the local community attempted to stop the machines he claimed were working outside of the construction site. When the police intervened, he promised to jump in the river if they attempted to arrest him. The construction of the plant had created a landslide that destroyed the road in the village. Helped by environmental activists, villagers in Rakita have removed pipes installed to serve a new hydroelectric power plant on the Rakitska river.

Deforestation 

According to Global Forest Watch, Serbia lost 52.8kha of tree cover from 2001 to 2019, equivalent to a 1.9% decrease in tree cover since 2000. The loss of forest cover can be attributed to illegal forest cutting, uncontrolled livestock grazing and forest fires. In 2020, the environmental initiative Do Not Let Belgrade D(r)own launched a petition against cutting down of trees in the Košutnjak forest. The petition was signed by over 70 000 people.

Serbia had a 2018 Forest Landscape Integrity Index mean score of 5.29/10, ranking it 105th globally out of 172 countries.

Endangered species 
270 animal species and 600 plant species in Serbia are considered to be under threat. The drainage of swamps and marshes for purposes of agricultural expansion have caused a loss of natural habitat, resulting in a decline in biodiversity.

Climate change

Floods 
Floods have become the dominant natural disaster in Serbia and it is projected that the number of floods will grow. In the past ten years, the most affected areas were western and central Serbia.

Drought 
Droughts, which are already frequent in Serbia, are also expected to become more common. They have significantly impacted agriculture, fruit farming and the wine industry.

High temperatures 
Between the beginning of January and the end of September 2020 there were four heat waves in Serbia. The frequency of heat waves has become a major threat to fruit farming.

Impact of climate change 
Many families have lost their homes, fields and lives due to climate change in Serbia. According to Goran Trivan, the Minister of Environmental Protection, in the period from 2000 to 2015, the financial damage caused by climate change is estimated to be over five billion euros.

Government response 
Though it is part of the Paris Agreement, Serbia still invests in coal-fired power stations and it has still not passed environmental law and strategy in accordance with EU's climate change policy. There is also a lack of documentation and understanding of climate changes in Serbia and their potential impacts on biodiversity.

See also 

 Climate of Serbia
 Geography of Serbia
NATO bombing of Yugoslavia

References

Environment of Serbia
Serbia